Philippe Levillain (27 November 1940 – 4 October 2021) was a French historian and academic. He specialized in the history of Catholicism and the papacy and notably wrote a historic encyclopedia of the papacy.

Biography
Levillain attended the Lycée Montaigne in Bordeaux for secondary school. He then studied at the École normale supérieure and earned an agrégation in history in 1965. He then served as an assistant professor at Paris Nanterre University from 1975 to 1981. He defended his doctoral thesis, Le deuxième concile du Vatican et sa procédure, in 1972 under the direction of René Rémond at Paris Nanterre University. He completed his  in 1979 and became a professor of contemporary history at the Charles de Gaulle University – Lille III, where he stayed from 1982 to 1986. He then spent the remainder of his career at Paris Nanterre University, where he became a professor emeritus.

Levillain was a senior member of the Institut Universitaire de France from 1998 to 2003 and was also a member of the Pontifical Committee for Historical Sciences. He was elected to be a member of the Académie des Sciences Morales et Politiques on 19 December 2011, succeeding the historian Pierre Chaunu. He served as President of the Société de l'histoire de France in 2012. He hosted the radio show  on France Culture from 1982 to 2014.

Levillain died on 4 October 2021 at the age of 80.

Distinctions
Commander of the Legion of Honour (2016)
Officer of the Ordre des Palmes académiques
Officer of the Ordre des Arts et des Lettres
Grand Officer of the Order of St. Sylvester
Commander of the Order of the Holy Sepulchre
Commander of the Order of Merit of the Italian Republic

Books
Boulanger, fossoyeur de la monarchie (1982)
Albert de Mun : Catholicisme français et catholicisme romain du syllabus au ralliement (1983)
Nations et Saint-Siège au xxe siècle (2003)
Le Moment Benoît XVI (2008)
Rome n'est plus dans Rome - Mgr Lefebvre et son église (2010)
La Papauté foudroyée (2015)
Le Tableau d’honneur (2020)

Collaborative books
Paul VI et la modernité dans l'Église (1983)
Le Vatican ou les frontières de la grâce (with François-Charles Uginet, 1992)
Dictionnaire historique de la papauté (1994); English translation: The Papacy. An Encylopedia, Routledge, London 2002
« Rome, l'unique objet de mon ressentiment », Regards critiques sur la papauté (2011)

References

1940 births
2021 deaths
Writers from Paris
French historians of religion
École Normale Supérieure alumni
Academic staff of Paris Nanterre University
Academic staff of Charles de Gaulle University – Lille III
Members of the Académie des sciences morales et politiques
Commandeurs of the Légion d'honneur
Officiers of the Ordre des Palmes Académiques
Officiers of the Ordre des Arts et des Lettres
Members of the Order of the Holy Sepulchre
Commanders of the Order of Merit of the Italian Republic
20th-century French historians
21st-century French historians